The Braille pattern dots-346 is a 6-dot braille cell with the top right and both bottom dots raised, or an 8-dot braille cell with the top right and both lower-middle dots raised. It is represented by the Unicode code point U+282c, and in Braille ASCII with the plus sign: +.

Unified Braille

In unified international braille, the braille pattern dots-346 is used to represent velar nasals, ie /ŋ/, and otherwise as needed.

Table of unified braille values

Other braille

Plus dots 7 and 8

Related to Braille pattern dots-346 are Braille patterns 3467, 3468, and 34678, which are used in 8-dot braille systems, such as Gardner-Salinas and Luxembourgish Braille.

Related 8-dot kantenji patterns

In the Japanese kantenji braille, the standard 8-dot Braille patterns 578, 1578, 4578, and 14578 are the patterns related to Braille pattern dots-346, since the two additional dots of kantenji patterns 0346, 3467, and 03467 are placed above the base 6-dot cell, instead of below, as in standard 8-dot braille.

Kantenji using braille patterns 578, 1578, 4578, or 14578

This listing includes kantenji using Braille pattern dots-346 for all 6349 kanji found in JIS C 6226-1978.

  -  ゆ/彳  =  行

Variants and thematic compounds

  -  selector 1 + ゆ/彳  =  憂
  -  selector 2 + ゆ/彳  =  罔
  -  selector 3 + ゆ/彳  =  臾
  -  selector 4 + ゆ/彳  =  至
  -  selector 4 + selector 4 + ゆ/彳  =  隶
  -  selector 5 + ゆ/彳  =  兪
  -  selector 6 + ゆ/彳  =  弯
  -  selector 6 + selector 6 + ゆ/彳  =  彎
  -  ゆ/彳 + selector 1  =  弓
  -  selector 1 + ゆ/彳 + selector 1  =  弖
  -  ゆ/彳 + selector 3  =  彳
  -  ゆ/彳 + selector 4  =  引
  -  ゆ/彳 + selector 5  =  弔

Compounds of 行

  -  ゆ/彳 + き/木  =  桁
  -  ゆ/彳 + に/氵  =  術
  -  ゆ/彳 + つ/土  =  街
  -  ゆ/彳 + え/訁  =  衛
  -  ゆ/彳 + ゆ/彳 + え/訁  =  衞
  -  ゆ/彳 + り/分  =  衝
  -  ゆ/彳 + せ/食  =  衡
  -  れ/口 + 宿 + ゆ/彳  =  哘
  -  つ/土 + 宿 + ゆ/彳  =  垳
  -  る/忄 + 宿 + ゆ/彳  =  愆
  -  い/糹/#2 + 宿 + ゆ/彳  =  絎
  -  ゆ/彳 + 宿 + ゆ/彳  =  衍
  -  ゆ/彳 + 龸 + ゐ/幺  =  衒
  -  ゆ/彳 + ら/月 + れ/口  =  衙
  -  ゆ/彳 + 宿 + い/糹/#2  =  衢
  -  ね/示 + 宿 + ゆ/彳  =  裄
  -  か/金 + 龸 + ゆ/彳  =  銜
  -  ゆ/彳 + う/宀/#3 + せ/食  =  鵆

Compounds of 憂

  -  比 + ゆ/彳  =  優
  -  て/扌 + selector 1 + ゆ/彳  =  擾

Compounds of 罔

  -  ゐ/幺 + ゆ/彳  =  網

Compounds of 臾

  -  ゑ/訁 + ゆ/彳  =  諛
  -  ⺼ + selector 3 + ゆ/彳  =  腴
  -  心 + 宿 + ゆ/彳  =  萸

Compounds of 至 and 隶

  -  ゆ/彳 + ぬ/力  =  到
  -  な/亻 + ゆ/彳  =  倒
  -  き/木 + ゆ/彳 + ぬ/力  =  椡
  -  う/宀/#3 + ゆ/彳  =  室
  -  心 + う/宀/#3 + ゆ/彳  =  榁
  -  ⺼ + う/宀/#3 + ゆ/彳  =  腟
  -  と/戸 + ゆ/彳  =  屋
  -  て/扌 + ゆ/彳  =  握
  -  し/巿 + と/戸 + ゆ/彳  =  幄
  -  に/氵 + と/戸 + ゆ/彳  =  渥
  -  ん/止 + と/戸 + ゆ/彳  =  齷
  -  宿 + ゆ/彳  =  窒
  -  ⺼ + 宿 + ゆ/彳  =  膣
  -  氷/氵 + ゆ/彳  =  致
  -  い/糹/#2 + 氷/氵 + ゆ/彳  =  緻
  -  よ/广 + ゆ/彳  =  康
  -  る/忄 + よ/广 + ゆ/彳  =  慷
  -  の/禾 + よ/广 + ゆ/彳  =  糠
  -  せ/食 + よ/广 + ゆ/彳  =  鱇
  -  ぬ/力 + ゆ/彳  =  粛
  -  ぬ/力 + ぬ/力 + ゆ/彳  =  肅
  -  れ/口 + ぬ/力 + ゆ/彳  =  嘯
  -  に/氵 + ぬ/力 + ゆ/彳  =  瀟
  -  ち/竹 + ぬ/力 + ゆ/彳  =  簫
  -  心 + ぬ/力 + ゆ/彳  =  蕭
  -  い/糹/#2 + ぬ/力 + ゆ/彳  =  繍
  -  ひ/辶 + ゆ/彳  =  逮
  -  ち/竹 + ひ/辶 + ゆ/彳  =  靆
  -  ね/示 + ゆ/彳  =  隷
  -  ね/示 + ね/示 + ゆ/彳  =  隸
  -  れ/口 + selector 4 + ゆ/彳  =  咥
  -  つ/土 + selector 4 + ゆ/彳  =  垤
  -  ふ/女 + selector 4 + ゆ/彳  =  姪
  -  き/木 + selector 4 + ゆ/彳  =  桎
  -  と/戸 + selector 4 + ゆ/彳  =  耋
  -  む/車 + selector 4 + ゆ/彳  =  蛭
  -  心 + 龸 + ゆ/彳  =  棣
  -  ゆ/彳 + け/犬 + の/禾  =  臻
  -  む/車 + 宿 + ゆ/彳  =  輊
  -  ゆ/彳 + 龸 + せ/食  =  鵄

Compounds of 兪

  -  れ/口 + ゆ/彳  =  喩
  -  る/忄 + ゆ/彳  =  愉
  -  や/疒 + ゆ/彳  =  癒
  -  や/疒 + や/疒 + ゆ/彳  =  瘉
  -  え/訁 + ゆ/彳  =  諭
  -  む/車 + ゆ/彳  =  輸
  -  心 + selector 5 + ゆ/彳  =  楡
  -  へ/⺩ + selector 5 + ゆ/彳  =  瑜
  -  む/車 + selector 5 + ゆ/彳  =  蝓
  -  な/亻 + 宿 + ゆ/彳  =  偸
  -  ゆ/彳 + 宿 + 心  =  愈
  -  て/扌 + 宿 + ゆ/彳  =  揄
  -  に/氵 + 龸 + ゆ/彳  =  渝
  -  ゆ/彳 + め/目 + 宿  =  覦
  -  み/耳 + 宿 + ゆ/彳  =  踰
  -  ひ/辶 + 宿 + ゆ/彳  =  逾
  -  か/金 + 宿 + ゆ/彳  =  鍮

Compounds of 弯 and 彎

  -  に/氵 + ゆ/彳  =  湾
  -  に/氵 + に/氵 + ゆ/彳  =  灣

Compounds of 弓 and 弖

  -  ゆ/彳 + ゆ/彳  =  弱
  -  ふ/女 + ゆ/彳 + ゆ/彳  =  嫋
  -  や/疒 + ゆ/彳 + ゆ/彳  =  嵶
  -  て/扌 + ゆ/彳 + ゆ/彳  =  搦
  -  に/氵 + ゆ/彳 + ゆ/彳  =  溺
  -  心 + ゆ/彳 + ゆ/彳  =  蒻
  -  せ/食 + ゆ/彳 + ゆ/彳  =  鰯
  -  ゆ/彳 + ち/竹  =  弛
  -  ゆ/彳 + な/亻  =  夷
  -  ふ/女 + ゆ/彳 + な/亻  =  姨
  -  に/氵 + ゆ/彳 + な/亻  =  洟
  -  や/疒 + ゆ/彳 + な/亻  =  痍
  -  か/金 + ゆ/彳 + な/亻  =  銕
  -  ゆ/彳 + 龸  =  弦
  -  ゆ/彳 + こ/子  =  弧
  -  ゆ/彳 + と/戸  =  張
  -  に/氵 + ゆ/彳 + と/戸  =  漲
  -  ゆ/彳 + む/車  =  強
  -  い/糹/#2 + ゆ/彳 + む/車  =  繦
  -  ね/示 + ゆ/彳 + む/車  =  襁
  -  ゆ/彳 + れ/口  =  弾
  -  ゆ/彳 + ゆ/彳 + れ/口  =  彈
  -  に/氵 + ゆ/彳 + selector 1  =  泓
  -  う/宀/#3 + ゆ/彳 + selector 1  =  穹
  -  み/耳 + ゆ/彳 + selector 1  =  躬
  -  ゆ/彳 + 宿 + む/車  =  弘
  -  ゆ/彳 + 宿 + 龸  =  弥
  -  ゆ/彳 + ふ/女 + ゑ/訁  =  弩
  -  ゆ/彳 + 宿 + み/耳  =  弭
  -  ゆ/彳 + ら/月 + ら/月  =  弸
  -  ゆ/彳 + 数 + め/目  =  弼
  -  ゆ/彳 + 比 + か/金  =  彁
  -  ゆ/彳 + 宿 + た/⽥  =  彊
  -  ゆ/彳 + 囗 + め/目  =  彌
  -  ゆ/彳 + 龸 + た/⽥  =  疆
  -  ゆ/彳 + 宿 + の/禾  =  粥
  -  ゆ/彳 + 宿 + れ/口  =  鬻

Compounds of 彳

  -  ゆ/彳 + の/禾  =  役
  -  ゆ/彳 + ひ/辶  =  彼
  -  ゆ/彳 + へ/⺩  =  往
  -  ゆ/彳 + い/糹/#2  =  征
  -  ゆ/彳 + け/犬  =  径
  -  ゆ/彳 + ゆ/彳 + け/犬  =  徑
  -  ゆ/彳 + し/巿  =  待
  -  ゆ/彳 + ふ/女  =  律
  -  心 + ゆ/彳 + ふ/女  =  葎
  -  ゆ/彳 + ゐ/幺  =  後
  -  ゆ/彳 + も/門  =  徐
  -  ゆ/彳 + は/辶  =  徒
  -  ゆ/彳 + よ/广  =  従
  -  ゆ/彳 + ゆ/彳 + よ/广  =  從
  -  る/忄 + ゆ/彳 + よ/广  =  慫
  -  心 + ゆ/彳 + よ/广  =  樅
  -  み/耳 + ゆ/彳 + よ/广  =  蹤
  -  ゆ/彳 + み/耳  =  聳
  -  ゆ/彳 + 日  =  得
  -  ゆ/彳 + 火  =  徘
  -  ゆ/彳 + さ/阝  =  御
  -  ね/示 + ゆ/彳 + さ/阝  =  禦
  -  ゆ/彳 + す/発  =  復
  -  ゆ/彳 + め/目  =  循
  -  ゆ/彳 + 氷/氵  =  微
  -  心 + ゆ/彳 + 氷/氵  =  薇
  -  ゆ/彳 + ろ/十  =  徳
  -  ゆ/彳 + や/疒  =  徴
  -  ゆ/彳 + 心  =  懲
  -  ゆ/彳 + ら/月  =  徹
  -  ゆ/彳 + 宿 + ほ/方  =  彷
  -  ゆ/彳 + 宿 + め/目  =  彿
  -  ゆ/彳 + selector 5 + そ/馬  =  徂
  -  ゆ/彳 + せ/食 + い/糹/#2  =  徃
  -  ゆ/彳 + 日 + す/発  =  徇
  -  ゆ/彳 + 宿 + や/疒  =  很
  -  ゆ/彳 + 囗 + れ/口  =  徊
  -  ゆ/彳 + 宿 + ん/止  =  徙
  -  ゆ/彳 + き/木 + な/亻  =  徠
  -  ゆ/彳 + 日 + へ/⺩  =  徨
  -  ゆ/彳 + 龸 + か/金  =  徭
  -  ゆ/彳 + 宿 + 氷/氵  =  徼
  -  ゆ/彳 + 宿 + ゐ/幺  =  徽
  -  ゆ/彳 + し/巿 + く/艹  =  黴

Compounds of 引

  -  や/疒 + ゆ/彳 + selector 4  =  矧
  -  む/車 + ゆ/彳 + selector 4  =  蚓

Compounds of 弔

  -  ゆ/彳 + 宿  =  弟
  -  な/亻 + ゆ/彳 + 宿  =  俤
  -  ぬ/力 + ゆ/彳 + 宿  =  剃
  -  る/忄 + ゆ/彳 + 宿  =  悌
  -  き/木 + ゆ/彳 + 宿  =  梯
  -  に/氵 + ゆ/彳 + 宿  =  涕
  -  め/目 + ゆ/彳 + 宿  =  睇
  -  ゆ/彳 + 宿 + せ/食  =  鵜
  -  ち/竹 + ゆ/彳  =  第

Other compounds

  -  囗 + ゆ/彳  =  岡
  -  い/糹/#2 + ゆ/彳  =  綱
  -  か/金 + ゆ/彳  =  鋼
  -  や/疒 + 囗 + ゆ/彳  =  崗
  -  き/木 + 囗 + ゆ/彳  =  棡
  -  仁/亻 + ゆ/彳  =  悠
  -  ち/竹 + 仁/亻 + ゆ/彳  =  筱
  -  い/糹/#2 + 仁/亻 + ゆ/彳  =  絛
  -  ⺼ + 仁/亻 + ゆ/彳  =  脩
  -  ほ/方 + ゆ/彳  =  旅
  -  ⺼ + ほ/方 + ゆ/彳  =  膂
  -  き/木 + ゆ/彳  =  樹
  -  囗 + 囗 + ゆ/彳  =  堽

Notes

Braille patterns